Alan Stroud (born 1965) is a former football (soccer) goalkeeper who represented New Zealand at international level.

Stroud played three official A-international matches for New Zealand between 1986 and 1995, the first two against Fiji, a 2–1 win on 19 September 1986, and a 0–1 loss two years later on a 2–1 win on 19 November 1988. Generally second or third choice keeper for the national side, Stroud did not earn his third full international start until seven years later, a 2–3  loss to Paraguay on 22 June 1995.

References 

1965 births
Living people
New Zealand association footballers
New Zealand international footballers
Association football goalkeepers
1996 OFC Nations Cup players